The Division of Sturt is an Australian electoral division in South Australia.  It was proclaimed at the South Australian redistribution of 11 May 1949. Sturt was named for Captain Charles Sturt, nineteenth century explorer.

Boundaries
Since 1984, federal electoral division boundaries in Australia have been determined at redistributions by a redistribution committee appointed by the Australian Electoral Commission. Redistributions occur for the boundaries of divisions in a particular state, and they occur every seven years, or sooner if a state's representation entitlement changes or when divisions of a state are malapportioned.

Currently stretching from Adelaide's mortgage belt suburbs in the centre-east to the wealthy south-eastern suburbs, boundaries at the seat's creation saw it take in suburbs as far west as Port Adelaide and as far north as Virginia until 1955, after which it began to occupy solely the eastern area of Adelaide. Current boundaries see Sturt covering an area of approximately 85 km² east of the city, from Oakden and Hope Valley in the north to Glen Osmond in the south, taking in the foothills of the Mount Lofty Ranges. Suburbs include Athelstone, Burnside, Campbelltown, Dernancourt, Frewville, Gilles Plains, Glen Osmond, Glenside, Glynde, Hectorville, Highbury, Hillcrest, Holden Hill, Hope Valley, Kensington, Klemzig, Magill, Marden, Oakden, Paradise, Tranmere and parts of Payneham and Rostrevor.

History

Sturt was first created for the 1949 election as a fairly safe Labor seat with a notional 6.1 percent two-party margin.  However, for all but four of its first 44 years, it was dominated by the Liberal political dynasty of Keith Wilson and his son, Ian.  Keith Wilson won the seat in 1949 with a marginal 2.8 percent two-party vote from an 8.9 percent two-party swing as part of the massive Liberal victory of that year.  He was unseated by Labor challenger Norman Makin at the 1954 election.  However, ahead of the 1955 election, a redistribution transferred most of Sturt's Labor-friendly territory to the newly-created Division of Bonython, turning Sturt from a three percent marginal Labor seat to a 2.4 percent marginal Liberal seat.  Makin opted to transfer to Bonython, and Keith Wilson retook Sturt in 1955 with a healthy 7.9 percent two-party swing, turning it into a safe Liberal seat in one stroke.  He was reelected without serious difficulty until handing Sturt to Ian in 1966.   Norm Foster defeated Ian at the 1969 election, but Ian regained the seat at the 1972 election even as Labor won government.

Ian was a key early member of the progressive Liberal Movement faction within the Liberal Party. However, he remained with the Liberals when the Liberal Movement became a separate party, and eventually served as a minister in the last term of the Fraser government. The Liberal Movement ran a candidate in Sturt in the 1974 election, polling 7.2 percent, much of which derived from Wilson’s vote. The Wilson dynasty ended at the 1993 election, when Ian was defeated for preselection by  Christopher Pyne.  Sturt was significantly redistributed prior to the 1993 election, reducing the Liberal margin from a fairly safe 7.7 percent two-party margin to a marginal notional 4.7 percent two-party margin.  However, Pyne retained the seat with a small swing in his favour, and has been returned at every election since.

The Liberal Movement's successor party, the Australian Democrats, traditionally polled well in Sturt, highlighted by 13.5 percent at their first showing in the 1977 election and 15 percent in the 1990 election, the best result by a minor party in Sturt. However, the Democrats vote later dropped sharply, they gained only 2.26 percent in the 2004 election. The party was deregistered in 2015. Additionally, an independent Liberal contested Sturt at the 1993 election, polling a respectable 14.6 percent.

2007 election
Pyne came close to losing Sturt at the 2007 election to Labor candidate Mia Handshin, after suffering a 5.9 percent two-party swing to finish with a 0.9 percent two-party margin (856 votes), which made Sturt the most marginal seat in South Australia. Prior to the pre-selection of Handshin, No Pokies MP Nick Xenophon had been considering running in the seat as an independent, before deciding to run for the Senate instead. At the 2010 election, Pyne increased his two-party vote to 53.4 percent, which saw neighbouring Boothby become South Australia's most marginal seat. Pyne increased his two-party margin to 10.1 percent in the 2013 election and was elevated to the Cabinet of Australia.

2016 election and Xenophon
Nick Xenophon confirmed in December 2014 that the Nick Xenophon Team (NXT) party would field lower and upper house candidates around the country at the 2016 federal election, citing the government's ambiguity on the Collins-class submarine replacement project as the primary motivation.

Even before the NXT candidate was announced, a ReachTEL opinion poll of 700 Sturt voters conducted during July 2015 put NXT on 38 percent, the Liberals on 30.8 (−23.6) percent and Labor on 17.4 (−11.5) percent. On the two-party vote, the Liberals were on 52 (−8.1) percent to Labor on 48 (+8.1) percent, however, with NXT leading the primary vote, the decisive two-candidate vote put NXT on a winning 62 percent to the Liberals on 38 (−22) percent. ABC psephologist Antony Green's 2016 federal election guide for South Australia stated NXT had a "strong chance of winning lower house seats and three or four Senate seats".

In late 2015, NXT nominated Sturt as their top South Australian lower house target and announced Matthew Wright as their NXT candidate in Sturt. Wright is an emergency physician at the Flinders Medical Centre who has also worked for humanitarian projects in the Solomon Islands, Papua New Guinea and East Timor.

A ReachTEL opinion poll in Sturt of 762 voters conducted by robocall on 9 June during the 2016 election campaign found NXT and the Liberals neck-and-neck.

Pyne retained the seat for the Liberals with a 55.9 percent two-party vote from a 4.2 percent two-party swing, reducing the seat from a safe to marginal status.

Members

Election results

Historical boundaries

See also
 2016 Australian federal election
 Results of the Australian federal election, 2016 (South Australia)

References
 ABC profile for Sturt: 2016
 Poll Bludger profile for Sturt: 2016
 AEC profile for Sturt: 2016

Notes

External links
 SA boundary map, 2001: AEC
 SA boundary map, 1984: Atlas SA

Electoral divisions of Australia
Constituencies established in 1949
1949 establishments in Australia
Charles Sturt